Grindelia tenella is a North American species of flowering plants in the family Asteraceae.

It is native to northeastern Mexico, in the States of Tamaulipas, Nuevo León, ane San Luis Potosí.

References

tenella
Endemic flora of Mexico
Flora of Tamaulipas
Flora of Nuevo León
Flora of San Luis Potosí
Plants described in 1934